Glam is the fifth studio album by German electronica duo Mouse on Mars, released in 1998. It was recorded for the purpose of being the score to the 1997 film of the same name. However, the soundtrack was rejected by the film's director Josh Evans.

Release
In 1998, Glam was originally released by Sonig on vinyl, though a CD was released in Japan by Tokuma Japan Communications. The Japanese release also included the additional tracks "Snap Bar", "Pool, Smooth and Hidder" and "Hetzchase Nailway". The album was later reissued on CD in the US by Thrill Jockey in 2003, with the aforementioned extra tracks included.

Critical reception

Ken Micallef of Rolling Stone praised Glam as "a beautiful and vital record." Kareem Estefan of Stylus Magazine said, "The pinnacle of an unimaginably creative band, Glam should be cherished as a masterpiece."

In 2017, Pitchfork placed Glam at number 31 on its list of "The 50 Best IDM Albums of All Time".

Track listing

References

External links
 
 

1998 albums
Mouse on Mars albums
Thrill Jockey albums